Muhammad Hardee bin Shamsuri (born 4 June 1994) is a Malaysian footballer who plays as a midfielder for UiTM.

Career statistics

Club

Honours

Club
Kuala Lumpur
 Malaysia Premier League: 2017

References

External links

1994 births
Living people
Malaysian footballers
Association football midfielders
Kuala Lumpur City F.C. players
Sri Pahang FC players
UiTM FC players
Malaysia Super League players